The dolmen de Bagneux is a megalith located in Saumur, France. It is one of the largest dolmen in France and in Europe.

Introduction
The dolmen in Bagneux is probably one of the most majestic French dolmens and the largest of the 4,500 dolmens spread out on about 60 French departments. Only, the dolmen in Essé near Retiers in Ille et Vilaine, is similar in size. In Europe, although there are very large dolmens in Great Britain or Denmark, only the Spanish dolmen in Antequera, near Málaga, is bigger.

Description

Size and temporal background
Like all dolmen this one is likely to date from the Neolithic c. 5,000 years ago, and would have received a large number of burials.

Materials
The flagstones of tertiary sandstone which make up the monument do not come from very far away. A layer of these sandstones, more or less dislocated, exists on the nearby heights of Bournand and Terrefort. The flagstones of the dolmen were probably scattered on the slopes of the hill from where they were pushed down, which meant a transport of 200 to 400 meters. The dolmen is oriented SE as nearly all dolmens in Anjou.

Description

The dolmen is composed of an intact chamber and of a damaged porch. The chamber is almost rectangular, only a little narrower on the entrance side. It is made of a single bottom flagstone, 4 supports on the northern side, 4 on the southern side, 4 covering stones and 2 flagstones framing the door. The stone on the right and side, when you look at the monument, is very thin and not very old. It is used to hide a recent wall, which could probably be destroyed. The support, in the middle of the chamber, does not support anything: it is probably what is left of a dividing wall. Such walls are very common among the dolmens of Anjou. The chamber is thus made of 15 flagstones and two wedging stones. Other wedging stones are probably still buried.

Legal status
The Dolmen de Bagneux is located on a private area and, as a matter of fact, is also a private property. Yet, its commercial exploitation is ruled by the protection and the conservation of the monuments classés of Monuments historiques (France).

See also 

 Prehistory of France
 Sites mégalithiques en Maine-et-Loire
 La Roche-aux-Fées
 Gavrinis

References 
Site internet du Dolmen de Bagneux

External links

Orientations of Dolmens of West-Central France

Dolmens in France